James Frederick Condrey DCM (1883–1952) was a Welsh professional footballer who played as a centre forward in the Football League for Nottingham Forest.

Personal life 
Condrey served as a lance corporal in the Royal Welch Fusiliers during the First World War. In August 1915, he was awarded the Distinguished Conduct Medal:

Condrey's brother Charles also served in the Royal Welch Fusiliers and was killed at Festubert on 16 May 1915.

Career statistics

References

1883 births
1952 deaths
Footballers from Wrexham
Welsh footballers
Association football forwards
Nantwich Town F.C. players
Telford United F.C. players
Nottingham Forest F.C. players
English Football League players
British Army personnel of World War I
Royal Welch Fusiliers soldiers
Recipients of the Distinguished Conduct Medal